Season 6 of Dana White's Contender Series commenced in July 2022 and in the US is exclusive to ESPN+, ESPN's new over-the-top subscription package.

Week 1 – July 26

Background
A bantamweight bout between Farid Basharat and Willian Souza was booked as the fifth fight on this card. However, Souza missed weight by ten  pounds and the Nevada Athletic Commission cancelled the bout.

Contract awards
The following fighters were awarded contracts with the UFC:
Joseph Pyfer

Week 2 – August 2

Background
It was announced on May 16, 2022 that Season 5 week 6 contender Shimon Smotritsky would be granted a second chance to win a UFC contract, having defeated former UFC fighter William Macário in his first bout following the Contender Series loss. The fight was against CES MMA's current Middleweight & Welterweight champion Billy Goff.

Contract awards
The following fighters were awarded contracts with the UFC:
 Chris Duncan, Vinicius Salvador, Francis Marshall, Waldo Cortes-Acosta, and Billy Goff

Week 3 – August 9

Contract awards
The following fighters were awarded contracts with the UFC:

 Jamal Pogues, Erik Silva, and Clayton Carpenter

Week 4 – August 16

Contract awards
The following fighters were awarded contracts with the UFC:

 Esteban Ribovics, Claudio Ribeiro, Jose Johnson, Hailey Cowan, and Nazim Sadykhov

Week 5 – August 23

Contract awards
The following fighters were awarded contracts with the UFC:

 Michael Parkin, Darrius Flowers, Jesus Santos Aguilar, Cameron Saaiman, and Denise Gomes

Week 6 – August 30

Contract awards
The following fighters were awarded contracts with the UFC:

Yusaku Kinoshita, Sedriques Dumas, Mateusz Rębecki, Victoria Dudakova and Blake Bilder.

Week 7 – September 6

Contract awards
The following fighters were awarded contracts with the UFC:

•  Vitor Petrino, Gabriel Bonfim, Karl Williams, and Ismael Bonfim.

Week 8 – September 13

Contract awards
The following fighters were awarded contracts with the UFC:
 Farid Basharat, Ikram Aliskerov, Trevor Peek, Bruna Brasil and Daniel Marcos.

Week 9 – September 20

Contract awards
The following fighters were awarded contracts with the UFC:

 Brunno Ferreira, Raul Rosas Jr., Austen Lane, Nurullo Aliev, and Jafel Filho

Week 10 – September 27

Contract awards
The following fighters were awarded contracts with the UFC:

 Bo Nickal, Sam Patterson, Jack Jenkins, Rafael Ramos Estevam, and Mateus Mendonça

References

Ultimate Fighting Championship television series